The Loire Valley is listed UNESCO World Heritage site since 30 November 2000 under the reference 933bis. The justification for the inscription of the territory is based on several criteria: its architectural heritage which includes the Châteaux of the Loire (criterion I), its exceptional cultural landscape (criterion II) and its cultural monuments, witnesses of the Renaissance and the century Enlightenment (criterion IV).

The list includes at this date 160 communes distributed in 2 regions (Pays de la Loire and Center-Val de Loire) and 4 departments (Maine-et-Loire, Loiret, Loir-et-Cher, Indre-et-Loire) on a distance of 280 km long stretching from Sully-sur-Loire to Chalonnes.

References

External links

 
Valleys of France
World Heritage Sites in France
Landforms of Centre-Val de Loire
Landforms of Pays de la Loire